The Almond Formation is a geological formation of Late Cretaceous (Late Campanian-Early Maastrichtian) age in Wyoming. It was deposited in marsh, deltaic, lagoonal, estuarine, and shallow marine environments along the western shore of the Western Interior Seaway. It consists primarily of fine- to medium-grained sandstone, siltstone, shale, and coal.  Fossils from the Almond Formation include remains of dinosaurs and plants.

Vertebrate paleofauna

Dinosaurs

See also

 List of dinosaur-bearing rock formations

Footnotes

References
 Weishampel, David B.; Dodson, Peter; and Osmólska, Halszka (eds.): The Dinosauria, 2nd, Berkeley: University of California Press. 861 pp. .

Cretaceous geology of Wyoming
Maastrichtian Stage of North America